Lithgow is a surname originating from Scottish as a habitational name from Linlithgow, between Edinburgh and Falkirk, which was probably named with British words related to modern Welsh llyn ‘lake’, ‘pool’ + llaith ‘damp’ + cau ‘hollow’. In the 13th and 14th centuries the name appears both with and without the first syllable. Originally, Lithgow was the name of the settlement and Linlithgow that of the lake. Lithgow was associated by folk etymology with Gaelic liath ‘gray’ + cu ‘dog’, and such a figure appears on the medieval borough seal. The surname is well represented in the Dominican Republic, South Africa, Australia, New Zealand, the United States, and the UK.

Notable people with the surname include:

People
Alan Lithgow (born 1988), Scottish football player
Alex Lithgow (1870–1929), composer (marches)/musician/conductor, a Tasmanian Australian, formerly of Invercargill, New Zealand
Arthur Lithgow (1915–2004), American-Dominican film director
Bert Lithgow (1881–1951), Australian rules footballer
Ian Lithgow (born 1972), American actor
James Lithgow (disambiguation), multiple people
John Lithgow (born 1945), American actor
John Lithgow (disambiguation), multiple people
Mike Lithgow (1920–1963), British aviator
Samuel Lithgow (1860–1937), British solicitor 
William Lithgow (disambiguation), multiple people

Scottish toponymic surnames